We Sing UK Hits is a 2011 karaoke game part of the We Sing series of games, developed by French studio Le Cortex. The game features 100% United Kingdom artists.

Gameplay
The gameplay is similar to the SingStar set of video games. Players are required to sing along with music in order to score points, matching pitch and rhythm. The game has anti cheat technology whereby tapping or humming will register on the screen but no points will be awarded. We Sing UK Hits also contains the addition of 'Star Notes' that allow the player to score even more points by matching the pitch and rhythm of certain hard to score parts of songs.

 40 full licensed songs with music videos where available
 Solo Mode
 Multiplayer modes - Group Battle, We Sing, Versus, Pass the Mic, First to X, Expert, Blind, Marathon.
 Real Karaoke mode
 Jukebox mode
 Singing Lessons
 Award System
 Customisable backgrounds
 Four Microphones
 Integrates with a USB hub

Due to hardware limitations with the Wii only having two USB ports, a USB hub is shipped with certain retail versions to add more USB ports. The game uses the standard logitech USB microphone for the Wii.

Track List

 Adele - Chasing Pavements
 Amy Winehouse - Rehab
 The Animals - The House of the Rising Sun
 Bananarama - Venus
 The Beautiful South - A Little Time
 Blur - Girls & Boys
 Bucks Fizz - Making Your Mind Up
 Coldplay - Speed of Sound
 David Bowie - Let's Dance
 Dido - White Flag
 Dusty Springfield - Son Of A Preacher Man
 East 17 - Stay Another Day
 Eliza Doolittle - Pack Up
 Elton John - Candle In The Wind
 Example - Kickstarts
 Florence + the Machine - You've Got The Love
 Gabrielle - Dreams
 Happy Mondays - Step On
 James Blunt - You're Beautiful
 Jay Sean feat. Lil Wayne - Down
 Jessie J - Do It Like A Dude
 Kim Wilde - Kids in America
 Leona Lewis - Bleeding Love
 Lulu & The Luvvers - Shout
 Madness - It Must Be Love
 McFly - 5 Colours In Her Hair
 Plan B - She Said
 Pulp - Common People
 Queen - Don't Stop Me Now
 Queen & David Bowie - Under Pressure
 Radiohead - Creep
 Rick Astley - Never Gonna Give You Up
 The Saturdays - Missing You
 Spice Girls - Who Do You Think You Are
 Sugababes - Push The Button
 Texas - I Don't Want A Lover
 Tinchy Stryder Ft. N-Dubz - Number 1
 The Ting Tings - That's Not My Name
 Tinie Tempah - Pass Out
 Wham! - Wake Me Up Before You Go-Go

Peripherals

Due to hardware limitations with the Wii only having two USB ports, a USB hub is shipped with certain retail sku's to add more USB ports. The game uses the standard Logitech USB microphone for the Wii.

See also
We Sing
We Sing Encore
We Sing Robbie Williams
SingStar
Karaoke Revolution
Lips

References

External links 
We Sing Website

2011 video games
Karaoke video games
Multiplayer and single-player video games
Music video games
THQ Nordic games
Video games developed in France
Wii games
Wii-only games
Wired Productions games